Pir Sharif (also Romanized as Pīr Sharīf; also known as Darreh Moḩammad-e ‘Alī, Bīrsharīf, Darreh-ye Moḩammad ‘Alī, Darreh-ye Moḩammad-e ‘Ālī, Thāf, and Zāf) is a village in Shirvan Rural District, in the Central District of Borujerd County, Lorestan Province, Iran. At the 2006 census, its population was 33, in 6 families.

References 

Towns and villages in Borujerd County